Thailand's Got Talent season 6 (also known as TGT) was the sixth season of the Thailand's Got Talent reality television series on the Channel 3 television network, and part of the global British Got Talent series. It is a talent show that features singers, dancers, sketch artists, comedians and other performers of all ages competing for the advertised top prize of 10,000,000 Baht (approximately $325,000). The show debuted on 12 June 2016. Thailand is also the fifth country in Asia to license Got Talent series. The four judges Chalatit Tantiwut, Patcharasri Benjamad, Kathaleeya McIntosh and Nitipong Hornak join hosts Ketsepsawat Palagawongse na Ayutthaya.

Broadcast 
 Audition, 6 weeks
 Culling-day, 1 week
 Semifinal, 5 weeks
 Final, 1 week

Semifinals

Semifinalists

{|
|-
|  ||| Golden buzzer
|-
|  ||| Public wildcard (previously eliminated act reinstated into the final by public vote)
|}

Semifinals Summary

Semifinal 1 (31 July)

Semifinal 2 (7 August)

Semifinal 3 (14 August)

Semifinal 4 (21 August)

Semifinal 5 (28 August)

Final (4 September)

Thailand's Got Talent seasons
2016 Thai television seasons